This is a list of electoral results for the electoral district of Eaglehawk in Victorian state elections.

Members for Eaglehawk

Election results

Elections in the 1920s

Elections in the 1910s

References

Victoria (Australia) state electoral results by district